Canterbury RFC is an English rugby union football club based in Canterbury, Kent. The club currently play in the fourth tier of English club rugby, participating in National League 2 East following their relegation from National League 1 at the end of the 2019–20 season. The club runs five senior sides, Canterbury Hellfire wheelchair rugby team, a ladies team, a touch rugby section and a full range of junior teams.

Current standings

History

Brief history of Canterbury RFC
Founded in 1929 Canterbury is the first East Kent club to achieve National League status. That milestone was reached when they became champions of London and South East Division One in 2005–06. In the most rewarding season in the club's history they also won the Kent Cup for a second successive year and gained further recognition when named rugby's Team of the Year by Rugby World magazine.

Founding fathers
Times have certainly changed from when the founding fathers, many of them involved with agriculture, first took their post-match pints and pies in a local pub and played on a hired pitch. Modern players might even envy them in that the season rarely started in earnest before October when all the fruit picking in the area was over and farmer/rugby players could start thinking about a free Saturday afternoon.

Dudley Hallwood
However, the club's first skipper was no son of the soil. Dudley Hallwood went on to become a successful businessman and newspaper cartoonist and the club's principal Sevens trophy still bears his name. Apart from the interruption of the Second World War, Canterbury built steadily over the years and boasted one of the strongest fixture lists in the county. They produced a number of fine players who represented Kent but the only tangible reward came in the 1974–75 season when the club beat old rivals Maidstone to win the County Cup.

Leagues
Some indeterminate years followed but the advent of leagues in the late 1980s was, like the experience of so many other clubs, a culture shock.
After first being placed in London 3 South East, Canterbury went steadily downhill. They fell as low as Kent Division 2 at the start of the 1990s but from that unpromising position a revival was born, which included the expansion of the junior and colts section.

New millennium
Throughout the next decade they climbed steadily up the league ladder and made it their ambition to be a London Division One club by the millennium. They would have achieved it, too, had it not been for the administrators. Having won the London 2 South championship in 2000 they were told there was no promotion because of re-organization of the leagues. Lesser sides may have crumbled but they won a place in the top London division two years later. Since then the club has become even stronger at every level.

Kent Cup
After the initial success in the county competition in 1975 the club had to wait another thirty years before winning the cup again. When they did get their hands on the trophy in 2005 the victory over Westcombe Park inspired a dominant four-year run. In the following three seasons they met the same opponents, Blackheath, in the final and each time Canterbury were the victors. In 2008–09 the county committee decreed that Kent's National League clubs must enter their second teams in the competition and the club's grip on the cup was loosened. It was four years before the trophy returned to Canterbury when they defeated Westcombe Park in 2012.

National leagues
After an outstanding promotion season Canterbury made a tentative start to their first venture into National League rugby but then exceeded all expectations by ending 2006–07 in fourth position in National 3 South. The demands of the higher league, which subsequently became National 2 South, increased every season but Canterbury responded to the challenge and were consistently in the top half of the table, despite the presence of many clubs with heavy financial backing. The 2010–11 season, however, proved to be a bridge too far and the team was relegated on the final day of the season. They responded in positive fashion to win back their place in National 2 South at the first attempt and since have re-established themselves.

The 2018–19 season saw the club's best performance in National 2 South to date, finishing in second place and earning a home play-off against their counterparts in National 2 North, Chester RUFC. The race for the play-off spot was a thrilling one with Henley Hawks and local rivals Tonbridge Juddians pushing hard until an away victory over Barnes RFC guaranteed the opportunity. In front of a record attendance of 2000 spectators, the club won a tight match 19–10.

Community commitment
The club's commitment to its community responsibilities continues to grow. One of the major achievements has been the successful establishment of a Wheelchair Rugby section. In the space if just eighteen months its members achieved a place in the national competitions. The club was rewarded in the 2015 RFU Presidents Awards when named as winner of the Community Engagement category, following success the previous year when Canterbury won the Best Managed Club accolade.

Ground
Canterbury RFC play at The Marine Travel Ground, named after a sponsorship deal starting in 2008, is situated on Merton Lane on the southern outskirts of Canterbury.  It is about 2.5 miles from Canterbury East railway station and 3.3 miles from Canterbury West railway station but is most easily reached by car as it is located next to the A2, and there is on-site parking. The Marine Travel Ground consists of a main pitch next to a small stand and the club-house, with four additional pitches for reserve and junior fixtures.  The main pitch ground capacity includes 75 seats in the stand, along with around 1,000 standing pitchside, bringing total capacity to approximately 1,075.

Honours
 Kent Cup winners (6): 1975, 2005, 2006, 2007, 2008, 2012
 Kent 2 champions: 1991–92
 Kent 1 champions: 1992–93
 London 3 South East champions: 1997–98
 Kent Plate winners: 2002, 2019
 London 2 South (Level 6) champions (2): 1999–00, 2001–02
 National League 3 London & SE (Level 5, formerly London Division 1) champions (2): 2005–06, 2011–12
 National League 2 (Level 4) Runner-Up and promotion play-off winner: 2018–19

Notes

References

External links
 Official website

English rugby union teams
Rugby clubs established in 1929
1929 establishments in England
Sport in Canterbury
Rugby union in Kent